The Turkish Basketball First League, also called TBL, is the second-tier level league of professional club basketball in Turkey. The league was previously known as Turkish Basketball Second League (TB2L).

Format and promotion and relegation
There are a total of 16 teams participating in the league for the 2019–20 TBL season. Each team plays each other in their group twice during the regular season. Team finishes at first place promotes to the top-tier level Turkish Basketball Super League (BSL) for the next season, teams ranked 2nd place to 9th place, compete in playoff format and winner of the playoff also promotes. The last two teams are relegated to the third-tier level Turkish Basketball Second League.

League champions and promoted teams
1970: Ankaragücü
1971: Şekerspor
1972: Kadıköyspor
1973: Adana Demirspor, Samsunspor
1974: Eczacıbaşı, Karşıyaka
1975: ODTÜ, Adana Demirspor
1976: Yenişehir, Tofaş
1977: Muhafızgücü, Ziraat Fakültesi
1978: Taçspor, Efes Pilsen
1979: İTÜ , TED Ankara Kolejliler
1980: Muhafızgücü, Güney Sanayi, ODTÜ, Mülkiye
1981: Çukurova Sanayi, Antbirlik
1982: TED Ankara Kolejliler, Oyak Renault 
1983: Ankara DSİ (withdrew)
1984: Anadolu Hisarı İdman Yurdu, Hilalspor, TED Ankara Kolejliler
1985: Yenişehir Hortaş, Tarsus İdman Yurdu (withdrew)
1986: Oyak Renault (withdrew), Beslen Makarna, Nasaş, Şekerspor
1987: Paşabahçe, Hilalspor
1988: Tekirdağ Büyük Salat, Beykoz
1989: Beşiktaş -, Nasaş
1990: Tofaş, TED Ankara Kolejliler
1991: Eczacıbaşı, PTT
1992: Kayseri Meysu, Konyaspor, Oyak Renault, Yıldırımspor, Darüşşafaka, Ortaköy
1993: Bakırköyspor, Antalyaspor, Çimtur (merger with Antalyaspor)
1994: Taçspor, Antbirlik, Vestel (withdrew), Kayseri Meysu
1995: Tuborg, Netaş
1996: TED Ankara Kolejliler, İTÜ
1997: Muratpaşa, Oyak Renault
1998: Kuşadası, TED Ankara Kolejliler
1999: İTÜ, Emlakbank (withdrew)
2000: Altay, Antbirlik, Karagücü (withdrew), Büyük Kolej

TBL history

Turkish Basketball League Federation Cup

Current clubs

References

External links
Official site 
Eurobasket.com League Profile

 
League 2
Turkey
Professional sports leagues in Turkey